The 1990-91 season saw Sampdoria win the Serie A title for the first time in their history, finishing five points ahead of second placed Milan. Third placed Internazionale were victorious in the UEFA Cup, with ninth-placed Roma compensating for their sub-standard league season with glory in the Coppa Italia, while Juventus's seventh-placed finish meant that they would be without European action for the first season in three decades. Lecce, Pisa, Cesena and Bologna were all relegated.

A notable record was set on 9 December 1990 in a Serie A fixture, when Bologna player Giuseppe Lorenzo was sent off after just 10 seconds for striking an opponent in the match against Parma. This was reportedly the fastest sending off in senior football worldwide at the time.

This is the most recent Serie A season to date in which a team won their first Italian title.

Number of teams by region

Coaches, kits and sponsors

Final classification

Results

Top goalscorers

Sources
Almanacco Illustrato del Calcio - La Storia 1898-2004, Panini Edizioni, Modena, September 2005

References

External links
 - All results on RSSSF website

Serie A seasons
Italy
1990–91 in Italian football leagues